Jean-Cyrille Rigaud (28 January 1750 – 29 January 1824) was a French poet, playwright and doctor from Occitania.

Rigaud was born in Montpellier.  Raised by his father, who was a librarian, he studied in Geneva. In his youth, he won a prize awarded by the Académie des Jeux floraux.

Publications 
 Éloge de Roucher, Montpellier, 1807, in-8°.
 Épître à MM. les étudiants en médecine de la Faculté de Montpellier, Montpellier, de l'impr. de J. Martel le jeune, 1823, in-8°
 Pouesias patouesas, Mounpeïé, Renaud, 1806, in-18.
 Poésies diverses, with Auguste Rigaud, Montpellier, de l'impr. de C.-J. Tournel, 1821, in-12 de 138 (contains fables, several speeches, including the Éloge de Roucher, read at the Académie de Montpellier in 1813, and inserted in the collection of that Société.)
 Pouésias patouèsas de Cyrilla Rigaud émbé edouquas péças d'Augusta Rigaud et dé différens doutvrs, Mounpéïé, Renaud, 1821, in-12.

Translations 
 Mémoire pour servir à l'histoire de quelques insectes, connus sous les noms de termites, ou fourmis blanches : et accompagné de figures gravées en taille-douce by Henry Smeathman, Paris, De La Rochelle, 1786.

Sources 

 Achille Chéreau, Le Parnasse médical français ou, Dictionnaire des médecins-poètes de la France, anciens ou modernes, morts ou vivants, Paris, Adrien Delahaye, 1874, (p. 477-478)
 Camille Dreyfus, André Berthelot, La Grande encyclopédie : inventaire raisonné des sciences, des lettres et des arts, t.28, Paris, Lamirault et cie, 1886, (p. 674).
 Joseph-François Michaud, Louis-Gabriel Michaud, Biographie universelle, ancienne et moderne. Nouvelle édition, t.36, Paris, C. Desplaces, 1863, (p. 23-24).
 Joseph-Marie Quérard, La France littéraire ou dictionnaire bibliographique des savants, Paris, Firmin Didot père et fils, 1836, (p. 48).

External links 
 Cyrille Rigaud on Data.bnf.fr 

19th-century French poets
19th-century French dramatists and playwrights
French librarians
French fabulists
French lyricists
English–French translators
Ghostwriters
French Protestants
1750 births
Writers from Montpellier
1824 deaths
19th-century French translators